Snowboarding was one of the competitions held at the 2019 Winter Deaflympics. Russia won most of the medals in the competition.

Medal table

Medal summary

Men

Women

References 

2019 in snowboarding
2019 Winter Deaflympics events